The siege of Fort Vincennes, also known as the siege of Fort Sackville and the Battle of Vincennes, was a Revolutionary War frontier battle fought in present-day Vincennes, Indiana won by a militia led by American commander George Rogers Clark over a British garrison led by Lieutenant Governor Henry Hamilton. Roughly half of Clark's militia were Canadien volunteers sympathetic to the American cause. After a daring wintertime march, the small American force was able to force the British to surrender the fort and in a larger frame the Illinois territory.

Prelude

On January 29, 1779 Francis Vigo, an Italian fur trader, came to Kaskaskia to inform Clark about Hamilton's reoccupation of Vincennes. Clark decided that he needed to launch a surprise winter attack on Vincennes before Hamilton could recapture the Illinois country in the spring. He wrote to Governor Henry:

Expedition

On February 5, 1779, Clark set out for Vincennes with Captain Bowman, his second-in-command, and 170 men, nearly half of them French volunteers from  the village of Kaskaskia  in the Illinois Country. Later, in a letter to his friend and mentor George Mason, Clark described his feeling for the journey as one of "forlorn hope," as his small force was faced with a long journey over land that was "in many parts flowing with water." While Clark and his men marched across country, 40 men left in an armed row-galley, which was to be stationed on the Wabash River below Vincennes to prevent the British from escaping by water.

Clark led his men across what is now the state of Illinois, a journey of about 180 miles. Clark later remembered that the weather was "wet, but, fortunately, not cold for the season" but found "a great part of the plains under water several inches deep." This made the men's march "difficult and very fatiguing." Provisions were carried on packhorses supplemented by wild game the men shot as they traveled. They reached the Little Wabash River on 13 February and found it flooded, making a stream about 5 miles (8 km) wide. They built a large canoe to shuttle men and supplies across. The next few days were especially trying: provisions were running low, and the men were almost continually wading through water. They reached the Embarras River on February 17. They were now only 9 miles (14 km) from Fort Sackville but the river was too high to ford. They followed the Embarrass down to the Wabash River, where the next day they began to build boats. Spirits were low: they had been without food for the last two days, and Clark struggled to keep men from deserting. Clark later wrote that "I conducted myself in such a manner that caused the whole to believe that I had no doubt of success, which kept their spirits up." Even so, a February 20 entry in Captain Bowman's Field Journal describes the men in camp as "very quiet but hungry; some almost in despair; many of the creole volunteers talking of returning." By February 22, Bowman reports that they still have "No provisions yet. Lord help us!" and that "Those that were weak and famished from so much fatigue went in the canoes" as they marched towards toward Vincennes.

Foreword
On February 20, five hunters from Vincennes were captured while traveling by boat. They told Clark that his little army had not yet been detected, and that the people of Vincennes were still sympathetic to the Americans. The next day, Clark and his men crossed the Wabash by canoe, leaving their packhorses behind. They marched towards Vincennes, sometimes in water up to their shoulders. The last few days were the hardest: crossing a flooded plain about 4 miles wide, they used the canoes to shuttle the weary from high point to high point. Shortly before reaching Vincennes, they captured a villager known to be a friend, who informed Clark that they were still unsuspected. Clark sent the man ahead with a letter to the inhabitants of Vincennes, warning them that he was just about to arrive with an army and that everyone should stay in their homes unless they wanted to be considered an enemy. The message was read in the public square. No one went to the fort to warn Hamilton.

Siege

Clark and his men marched into Vincennes at sunset on 23 February, entering the town in two divisions, one commanded by Clark and the other by Bowman. Taking advantage of a slight elevation of land which concealed his men but allowed their flags to be seen, Clark maneuvered his troops to create the impression that 1,000 men were approaching. While Clark and Bowman secured the town, a detachment was sent to begin firing at Fort Sackville (previously named Fort Vincennes) after their wet black powder was replaced by local resident François Busseron. Father Pierre Gibault convinced residents to support the American cause. Despite the commotion, Hamilton did not realize the fort was under attack until one of his men was wounded by a bullet coming through a window.

Clark had his men build an entrenchment 200 yards in front of the fort's gate. While militia fired at the fort throughout the night, small squads crept up to within 30 yards of the walls to get a closer shot. The British fired their cannon, destroying a few houses in the city but doing little damage to the besiegers. Clark's men silenced the cannon by firing through the fort's portholes, killing and wounding some of the gunners. Meanwhile, Clark received local help; the villagers freely gave him powder and ammunition they had hidden from Hamilton's men, and Young Tobacco, a Piankeshaw chief, offered to have his 100 men assist in the attack. Clark declined the chief's offer, fearing that in the darkness his men might mistake the friendly Piankeshaws and Kickapoo for one of the enemy tribes that were in the area.

At about 9:00 a.m. on 24 February, Clark sent a message to the fort demanding Hamilton's surrender. Hamilton declined, and the firing continued for another two hours until Hamilton sent out his prisoner, Captain Leonard Helm, to offer terms. Clark sent Helm back with a demand of unconditional surrender within 30 minutes, or else he would storm the fort. Helm returned before the time had expired and presented Hamilton's proposal for a three-day truce. This too was rejected but Clark agreed to meet Hamilton at the village church.

During these negotiations, a British-allied war party of between 15 and 20 Odawa and Lenape warriors, led by two Canadiens, neared Clark's encampments after leaving the Vincennes Trace. The party, which escorted two captive Canadien deserters in tow, had been ordered by Hamilton to  patrol the nearby area. Having been informed by his Kickapoo allies of the party's movements, Clark ordered a detachment of soldiers under the command of Captain John Williams to capture them. The war party mistakenly assumed Williams and his men were there to escort them into Fort Vincennes, and greeted them by discharging their firearms. Williams responded by firing his weapon before seizing one of the Canadien leaders, which led the rest of the party to flee in panic; Williams' men opened fire, killing two, wounding three and capturing eight. The two deserters were released after being captured, and the remaining six captives consisted of a Canadien and five Indians. Clark ordered the five Indians to be murdered before the fort to terrify the British and sow dissension between them and their Indian allies.

At the church, Clark and Bowman met with Hamilton and signed terms of surrender. At 10:00 a.m. on 25 February, Hamilton's garrison of 79 men marched out of the fort. Clark's men raised the American flag over the fort and renamed it Fort Patrick Henry. Clark sent Hamilton, seven of his officers, and 18 other prisoners to Williamsburg. Canadiens who had accompanied Hamilton were paroled after taking an oath of neutrality. A team of Clark's soldiers and local militia was sent upriver on the Wabash, where a supply convoy was captured, along with British reinforcements and Philippe Dejean, Hamilton's judge in Detroit.

In the aftermath of the capture a six-pound cannon, which was tampered by the British ahead of time, was fired in celebratory fashion by a few of Clark's soldiers. The blast accidentally ignited nearby cannon cartridges resulting in a devastating explosion that mortally wounded Joseph Bowman and injured officer Edward Worthington, four privates, and a British soldier. Bowman succumbed to his wounds a few months after the incident at Fort Patrick Henry.

Aftermath

Clark had high hopes after his recapture of Vincennes. "This stroke", he said, "will nearly put an end to the Indian War." In the coming years of the war, Clark attempted to organize a campaign against Detroit but each time the expedition was called off because of insufficient men and supplies. Meanwhile, settlers began to pour into Kentucky after hearing news of Clark's victory. In 1779, Virginia opened a land office to register claims in Kentucky, and settlements such as Louisville were established.

The winter expedition was Clark's most significant military achievement and became the source of his reputation as an early American military hero. Clark was credited with capturing the fort without losing a single soldier. When news of his victory reached General George Washington, Clark's success was celebrated and was used to encourage the alliance with France. Washington recognized his achievement had been gained without support from the regular army in men or funds. Virginia capitalized on Clark's success by laying claim to the whole of the Old Northwest, calling it Illinois County in December 1778. In early 1781, Virginia resolved to hand the region over to the central government, paving the way for the final ratification of the Articles of Confederation. These lands became the Northwest Territory of the United States.

See also
 American Revolutionary War § Stalemate in the North. Places "Siege of Fort Vincennes" in overall sequence and strategic context.

References

Fort Vincennes
Knox County, Indiana
Fort Vincennes
Fort Vincennes
1779 in the United States
Fort Vincennes